Martha Ann Ricks (born Erskine, 1817–1901) was an Americo-Liberian woman who was among the early colonists there. Born into slavery in Tennessee, she was freed by her father George Erskine and emigrated at age 13 with him and her family to Liberia in 1830. 

While chiefly working in agriculture there, Ricks also was known for her needlework and became an expert quilter.  She became interested in Queen Victoria and worked for more than two decades on a quilt for her. In 1892 Ricks traveled with former First Lady Jane Roberts to England, where she received a Royal Audience with Queen Victoria and personally gave her the quilt.

Life
Martha Ann was born into slavery in Tennessee. Her father George Erskine saved money and purchased her,  her mother and siblings, in order to free all of them.   He and the family emigrated in 1830 to Clay-Ashland, Liberia, as part of the American Colonization Society project there.  

In Liberia, Erskine married Zion Harris, an emigrant whom she had first met on board ship to Liberia. The couple were successful farmers and traveled with Liberia's first president Joseph Jenkins Roberts in 1848, after independence, visiting both the United States and the United Kingdom. 

The Harris couple raised turkeys, ducks, and sheep, as well as growing crops. Ricks was also known for the high quality of her needlework. Ricks was very good at quilting and had won a prize in 1858 for silk stockings that she made. After Harris died, she married again, to Henry Ricks, and became known as Martha Ann Ricks.

Over the years, Ricks developed an interest in Queen Victoria. She was determined that one day she would meet the queen. Over the course of 25 years, Ricks worked on a quilt that she wanted to give to the queen. 
The quilt depicted the Liberian Coffee Tree and was made of silk cotton. Its pattern included more than 300 green leaves, and coffee berries in red. A tree of life trunk occupied the center of the quilt, and the background was white. 

When Ricks turned 76, Liberian Ambassador Edward Blyden arranged for her to travel to England and be given an audience with the queen. Accompanied by former First Lady Jane Roberts of Liberia, Ricks met the queen at Windsor Castle on July 16, 1892. Ricks died in 1901.

Legacy
Kyra Hicks wrote a biography, Martha Ann's Quilt for Queen Victoria (2012).
Ricks's story is featured in a short radio documentary on BBC, "Looking for Aunt Martha's Quilt" (2017), read by her descendant Florence Dennis-Huskin.

References 

1817 births
1901 deaths
American emigrants to Liberia
19th-century American slaves
Americo-Liberian people
People from Montserrado County
People from Tennessee
Quilters
19th-century Liberian women
20th-century Liberian women